is a former Nippon Professional Baseball pitcher.

References 

1966 births
Living people
People from Kōnan, Aichi
Baseball people from Aichi Prefecture
Baseball players at the 1988 Summer Olympics
Olympic baseball players of Japan
Olympic silver medalists for Japan
Nippon Professional Baseball pitchers
Yomiuri Giants players
Fukuoka Daiei Hawks players
Fukuoka SoftBank Hawks players
Orix Buffaloes players
Japanese baseball coaches
Nippon Professional Baseball coaches
Medalists at the 1988 Summer Olympics